Algoma Mariner is a Canadian lake freighter delivered to Algoma Central on 31 May 2011. The bulk carrier was the first new Canadian-flagged vessel on the Great Lakes in 25 years. Algoma Mariner is a Seawaymax vessel, designed to carry dry bulk through the Saint Lawrence Seaway and Great Lakes. The vessel was constructed at the Chengxi Shipyard in China and is currently in service.

Description
Algoma Mariner is a self-unloading dry-bulk carrier designed by Deltamarin that has a gross tonnage (GT) of 24,535 tons, a net tonnage (NT) of 9,504 tons and a deadweight tonnage (DWT) of 38,000 tons. The self-unloading system is equipped with dust suppression technology.

Service history
The vessel's keel was laid down on 21 October 2010 by Chengxi Shipyard, of Jiangyin, China for Algoma Central with the yard number 324. The vessel was completed on 31 May 2011. The bulk carrier departed China, sailed across the Pacific Ocean to the Panama Canal, passed through it and sailed up the eastern seaboard of North American to arrive at the vessel's first Canadian port of call, Port-Cartier, Quebec on 2 August. Algoma Mariner was christened in Port Colborne, Ontario on 25 August 2011, by Lisa Badawey, wife of Port Colborne's mayor Vance Badawey. The vessel cost over CAD$50 million to construct.

Algoma Mariners port of registry is Port Colborne, marking the first new Canadian-flagged vessel on the Great Lakes in 25 years upon her arrival. The vessel serves ports along the Great Lakes delivering dry bulk goods such as iron ore, coal, grain salt and aggregates.

References

2011 ships
Ships built in China
Great Lakes freighters
Algoma Central Marine